Cristina Ghiță (born 16 December 1982) is a retired Romanian foil fencer, team silver medallist in the 2002 European Championships and in the 2005 World Championships.

Career

Ghiță joined the national team in the 2004–05 season. At the 2005 World Championships Romania created an upset by defeating in the quarter-finals the Italian team led by Valentina Vezzali. They overcame Hungary, but were edged out 20–19 by South Korea and came away with a silver medal. The next season, Romania won the silver medal in the 2006 European Championships in İsmir after losing to Russia in overtime.

In the 2008–09 season, Romania placed 4th in the World Championships in Antalya after being defeated by Italy in the semi-final, then by Germany in the match for the bronze medal. The year after, Romania were knocked out by Venezuela in the first round of the World Championships in Paris. The lack of results and funds pushed the Romanian Fencing Federation into dissolving the national foil team in early 2011.

Ghiță retired from international competition after the 2011–12 season. She won the 2013 Romanian national championship after defeating fellow Stelist Mălina Călugăreanu.

References

External links
 Profile at the European Fencing Confederation

Romanian female fencers
Romanian foil fencers
1982 births
Living people